Scott Leslie Mann (born 24 June 1977) is a British Conservative politician and has been the Member of Parliament (MP) for North Cornwall since 2015. He currently serves as a Government Whip (Lord Commissioner of the Treasury). He served as Parliamentary Under-Secretary of State for Growth and Rural Affairs from September to October 2022. Previously he represented the Wadebridge West ward on Cornwall Council between 2009 and 2016.

Early life 
Mann was born on 24 June 1977 in Wadebridge, Cornwall, where he also grew up. He attended Wadebridge Secondary School. His father had grown up in Bodmin and had a career in boat construction. His mother grew up in St Kew Highway, Cornwall.

After leaving school at 16, Mann attended St Austell College, completing a BTEC business diploma, before becoming a postman for the Royal Mail in 1995 until 2015, based at the local sorting office in Wadebridge.

Political career 
In 2007, Mann was elected as a Conservative councillor for Wadebridge West, serving briefly on the North Cornwall District Council before it was absorbed by the now unitary authority that is Cornwall Council in 2009, when he was re-elected. In 2013, Mann retained his seat as county councillor for Wadebridge West.

In February 2012, Mann resigned as deputy leader of the Conservative group on Cornwall Council in protest at £16 million of public money being used to fund a proposed sports stadium near Truro. In 2014, Mann met with Conservative MP and Secretary of State for Culture, Media and Sport Sajid Javid in Cornwall to campaign for the continued support for community leisure centres which were at threat of losing funding from the local authority.

Member of Parliament (North Cornwall)
In 2013, Mann was named as the Conservative Party's prospective parliamentary candidate for North Cornwall in the run-up to the 2015 general election.

Mann was subsequently elected as the Member of Parliament for the constituency of North Cornwall after winning the seat in the 2015 general election. Mann received 21,689 votes, beating the previous MP, Dan Rogerson, by 6,621 votes with an approximate 9,000-vote swing. He became the first Conservative MP for the area since 1992, as well as contributing to the fact that all six Cornwall constituencies elected Conservative candidates—the first time it had happened in over a hundred years. Along with Sarah Newton, MP for Truro & Falmouth, he took his Parliamentary oath in the Cornish language.

Following his election as an MP he resigned as a councillor in February 2016, after he had come under pressure to resign for his poor attendance at council meetings. At the subsequent by-election in April 2016, his former seat was won by the Liberal Democrat candidate Karen McHugh.

In November 2015, Mann introduced a Private Member's Bill to give Town and Parish Councils the power to hold community referendums to alter speed limits. The Bill received its second reading in February 2016, but as it was opposed by both the Government and the Opposition, it was subsequently withdrawn.

Mann campaigned for the United Kingdom to leave the European Union in the 2016 EU referendum.

In December 2016, Mann was elected (unopposed) to the House of Commons' Environmental Audit Select Committee, on which he served until May 2017.

In June 2017, Mann was re-elected as the MP for North Cornwall following the snap general election, garnering 23,835 votes and a 50.7% share of the vote. His majority also increased to 7,200 votes. Mann was subsequently appointed as a Parliamentary Private Secretary (PPS) for Transport – an unpaid role to assist and support government ministers in the Department for Transport. Following the Cabinet reshuffle in January 2018, Mann was appointed as PPS to HM Treasury.

In July 2018, Mann introduced his second Private Member's Bill – namely the Bathing Waters Bill – to introduce penalties which could be levied against water companies who pump sewage into the sea. During heavy rainfall, sewage is sometimes pumped into the sea through Combined Sewage Overflow systems to reduce pressure on sewage systems.

On 16 July 2018, Mann resigned from his role as Parliamentary Private Secretary to HM Treasury in protest at the Prime Minister Theresa May's "watered down" Brexit plan. In September 2018, he agreed with fellow Conservative MP Johnny Mercer that the Prime Minister Theresa May "could not lead their party into the next general election".

Mann employs his partner as a part-time secretary on a salary up to £30,000, which drew criticism by the press. Although MPs who were first elected in 2017 have been banned from employing family members, the restriction is prospective, meaning that Mann's employment of his partner is lawful.

In May 2016, it emerged that Mann was one of a number of Conservative MPs being investigated by police in the United Kingdom general election, 2015 party spending investigation, for allegedly spending more than the legal limit on constituency election campaign expenses.  However, in May 2017, the Crown Prosecution Service said that while there was evidence of inaccurate spending returns, it did not "meet the test" for further action.

In March 2017, The Daily Telegraph reported that Mann was one of nine MPs who had claimed Amazon Prime subscriptions on their parliamentary expenses. The Independent Parliamentary Standards Authority, responsible for handling expenses claims, told the paper subscriptions could be claimed but MPs must "justify the subscription is primarily used for Parliamentary purposes". He responded that the subscription was a mistake after his office had purchased stationery from the website, and that Amazon had issued a refund.

In December 2019, Mann was re-elected as Member of Parliament for North Cornwall, more than doubling his majority to 14,752 with 59.4% of the vote – up by 8.6 percentage points from 2017.

Shortly after his return to Parliament in January 2020, Mann was appointed as Parliamentary Private Secretary to Gavin Williamson, the Secretary of State for Education.

In 2020 Mann became one of four vice-chairs of the All Party Parliamentary Group on Whistleblowing, which has been subject to criticism by some campaigners on whistleblowing law reform.

Whip
In January 2021, Mann was appointed as Government Whip, Lord Commissioner of HM Treasury. That April he was shifted to become an Assistant Government Whip (unpaid).

Minister
On Tuesday, 20th September 2022 Mann received his first ministerial appointment as Parliamentary Under Secretary of State at the Department for Environment, Food and Rural Affairs. This was part of the UK Government ministerial reshuffle following the appointment of Liz Truss as Prime Minister earlier that month.

Personal life
Mann lives in Wadebridge and in London. He has one daughter. He is the honorary vice-president of Wadebridge Cricket Club. He is a supporter of Plymouth Argyle F.C.

On a summer boat trip in 2016 Mann had to be rescued from drowning by fellow MP Johnny Mercer after he voluntarily jumped into the water because, he was "ashamed to admit" that he could not swim. He later said he endangered his life because he was "afraid to own up to something that [he] considered an embarrassment". He has since taken swimming lessons. He ran the London Marathon in 2017.

References

External links

1977 births
Members of Cornwall Council
Conservative Party (UK) councillors
Conservative Party (UK) MPs for English constituencies
Living people
Members of the Parliament of the United Kingdom for North Cornwall
People from Wadebridge
UK MPs 2015–2017
UK MPs 2017–2019
UK MPs 2019–present
British postmen